Israel Reyes Ledesma Magaña (16 May 1954 – 27 November 2014) was a Mexican politician from the Institutional Revolutionary Party. From 2009 to 2012 he served as Deputy of the LXI Legislature of the Mexican Congress representing the State of Mexico.

References

1954 births
2014 deaths
Politicians from Guanajuato
Institutional Revolutionary Party politicians
21st-century Mexican politicians
Deaths from cancer in Mexico
People from Irapuato
Deputies of the LXI Legislature of Mexico
Members of the Chamber of Deputies (Mexico) for the State of Mexico